The following lists events that happened during 1930 in New Zealand.

Population
 Estimated population as of 31 December: 1,506,800
 Increase since previous 31 December 1929: 20,700 (1.39%)
 Males per 100 females: 103.9

Incumbents

Regal and viceregal
Head of state – George V
Governor-General – General Sir Charles Fergusson Bt GCMG KCB DSO MVO succeeded the same year by The Lord Bledisloe GCMG KBE PC

Government
The 23rd New Zealand Parliament continued with the United Party in power.
Speaker of the House – Charles Statham (Independent)
Prime Minister – Sir Joseph Ward (United) until 28 May, then George Forbes (United) 
Minister of Finance – Joseph Ward (United) until 28 May, then George Forbes (United)
Minister of Foreign Affairs – Joseph Ward (United) until 28 May, then George Forbes (United).
 Attorney-General – Thomas Sidey (United) until 22 September, then William Downie Stewart
Chief Justice — Sir Michael Myers

Parliamentary opposition
 Leader of the Opposition – Gordon Coates (Reform).

Main centre leaders
Mayor of Auckland – George Baildon 
Mayor of Wellington – George Troup 
Mayor of Christchurch – John Archer 
Mayor of Dunedin –  Robert Black

Events 
 August: The Atmore Report on the education system is presented.
 4 November: Superhorse Phar Lap wins the Melbourne Cup.

Arts and literature

See 1930 in art, 1930 in literature, :Category:1930 books
Kowhai Gold, an anthology of New Zealand poetry edited by Quentin Pope published in London and New York

Music

See: 1930 in music

Radio

See: Public broadcasting in New Zealand

Film
 3 January: The Coubray-tone News- the first New-Zealand made "talkies" (film with sound) – premiered.
The Romance of Maoriland

See: :Category:1930 film awards, 1930 in film, List of New Zealand feature films, Cinema of New Zealand, :Category:1930 films

Sport

British Empire Games

Chess
The 39th National Chess Championship was held in Wanganui, and was won by G. Gunderson of Melbourne.

Cricket
 New Zealand's first ever Test matches, a home series of four three-day games against England. Series won 1–0 by England
 10,11,13 January Lancaster Park, Christchurch. New Zealand (112 and 131) lost by eight Wickets to England (181 and 66/2).
 24,25,27 January Basin Reserve, Wellington. New Zealand (440 and 164/4dec.) drew with England (320 and 107/4).
 14,15,17 February Eden Park, Auckland. England (330/4dec.) drew with New Zealand (96/1) (First two days were abandoned due to rain).
 21,22,24 February at Eden Park: England (540 and 22/3) drew with New Zealand (387) – this fourth Test was arranged due to the rain washout of the third test.

Golf
 The 20th New Zealand Open championship was won by Andrew Shaw, his third title.
 The 34th National Amateur Championships were held in the Manawatu district 
 Men: H.A. Black (Mirimar)
 Women: Miss O. Kay

Horse racing

Harness racing
 New Zealand Trotting Cup – Wrackler
 Auckland Trotting Cup – Carmel

Thoroughbred racing
 New Zealand Cup – Nightmarch
 Avondale Gold Cup – Prodice
 Auckland Cup – Motere
 Wellington Cup – Concentrate
 New Zealand Derby – Cylinder

Lawn bowls
The national outdoor lawn bowls championships are held in Dunedin.
 Men's singles champion – F. Lambeth (Balmacewen Bowling Club)
 Men's pair champions – G.L. Gladding, H. Jenkins (skip) (Carlton Bowling Club)
 Men's fours champions – E.S. Wilson, L.C. Buist, J. Dowland, D.M. Stuart (skip) (St Kilda Bowling Club)

Rugby union
:Category:Rugby union in New Zealand, :Category:All Blacks
 Ranfurly Shield

Rugby league
New Zealand national rugby league team

Soccer
 1930 Chatham Cup won by Petone
 Provincial league champions: 
	Auckland:	YMCA
	Canterbury:	Thistle
	Hawke's Bay:	Whakatu
	Nelson:	Thistle
	Otago:	Seacliff
	Southland:	Corinthians
	Taranaki:	Caledonian
	Waikato:	Pukemiro
	Wanganui:	KP's
	Wellington:	Hospital

Births

January
 3 January – Ruth Dowman, athlete
 8 January  – Dave Spence, cricketer
 21 January – Peter Tapsell, politician
 24 January – Terence Bayler, actor
 27 January – Bob O'Dea, rugby union player

February
 10 February
 Russell Kerr, ballet dancer, choreographer and producer
 Malcolm McCaw, cricketer, accountant
 11 February – Bruce Cathie, pilot, author
 17 February – Jonathan Bennett, philosopher
 20 February
 Kevin Meates, rugby union player
 Vida Stout, limnographer
 21 February – Joan Metge, social anthropologist
 22 February – Ivan Mercep, architect

March
 5 March – Brian Bell, ornithologist
 9 March – Mina Foley, opera singer
 20 March – Thomas Williams, Roman Catholic cardinal
 25 March – Margery Blackman, weaver
 27 March – Paul Cotton, diplomat
 28 March – Helmer Pedersen, sailor
 30 March – Charlie Steele Jr., association football player, rugby union player
 31 March – Barry Mitcalfe, poet, anti-nuclear activist

April
 1 April – Dennis Young, rugby union player
 3 April – Marama Martin, television and radio broadcaster
 5 April – Bill Tinnock, rower
 7 April – Koro Dewes, Ngāti Porou kaumātua and Māori language advocate
 8 April
 David Benney, applied mathematician
 Ivan Vodanovich, rugby union player, coach and administrator
 18 April – Clive Revill, singer, actor
 19 April
 Reg Douglas, rower
 Ewan Jamieson, military leader
 20 April – Helen Mackenzie, swimmer

May
 13 May – Richard Kearney, jurist
 20 May – Alexia Pickering, disabilities rights campaigner
 21 May – Keith Davis, rugby union player
 24 May – Ivor Richardson, jurist
 30 May – Colleen Dewe, politician

June
 1 June – Matt Poore, cricketer
 7 June – Ian Leggat, cricketer
 15 June – Bev Brewis, high jumper
 25 June – Peter Wight, cricketer

July
 3 July – Kihi Ngatai, Ngāi Te Rangi leader, horticulturalist
 11 July
 Jack Alabaster, cricketer
 Guy McGregor, field hockey player
 25 July – Murray Chapple, cricketer
 30 July – David Weston, cricketer

August
 2 August – Mick Bremner, rugby union player and administrator
 5 August – Bruce Turner, field hockey player, cricketer
 12 August – Brian Molloy, rugby union player, plant ecologist, conservationist
 15 August
 Leo T. McCarthy, politician
 Azalea Sinclair, netball player
 18 August
 Graeme Dallow, police officer
 Denis McLean, diplomat, author
 21 August – Cyril Eastlake, rugby league player
 28 August – Tony Small, diplomat
 30 August – Noel Harford, cricketer

September
 3 September – Cherry Wilder, fantasy and science-fiction writer
 6 September – David Simmons, ethnologist
 10 September – Pauline Engel, educator
 11 September – Kenneth Minogue, political theorist
 19 September
 Robin Archer, rugby union player
 Volker Heine, physicist
 22 September – John Hill, cricketer
 28 September – Sel Belsham, rugby league player
 29 September – Jocelyn Fish, politician, women's rights campaigner
 30 September – George Menzies, rugby league player

October
 1 October – Bob Jolly, veterinary academic
 21 October – Lawrence Reade, cricketer
 22 October – Lois McIvor, artist
 29 October – Hugh Burry, rugby union player, medical academic

November
 11 November – Ian Burrows, army officer
 16 November – Merv Richards, pole vaulter, gymnastics and pole vault coach
 17 November – Chic Littlewood, television entertainer, actor
 20 November – James Hill, rower
 22 November – Bill Lambert, politician
 30 November – Leonard Boyle, Roman Catholic bishop

December
 6 December – Natalie Wicken, netball player
 16 December
 Leslie Clark, cricketer
 Harry Turbott, architect, landscape architect
 23 December – Jean Stewart, swimmer
 27 December – John Drawbridge, artist
 31 December – Ron Johnston, motorcycle speedway rider

Undated
 Daphne Walker, singer

Deaths

January–February
 6 January – Walter Harper, Anglican clergyman (born 1848)
 9 January – Joseph Harkness, politician (born 1850)
 11 January – Eru Tumutara, Ringatū bishop (born 1859)
 24 January
 Ellen Crowe, community leader (born 1847)
 Sophia Taylor, suffragist (born 1847)
 Herman van Staveren, rabbi, philanthropist (born 1849)
 25 January – Pat Hickey, trade union leader (born 1882)
 5 February – John Holland Baker, surveyor, public servant (born 1841)
 11 February – Anne Wilson, poet, novelist (born 1848)
 12 February – Elizabeth Fergusson, nurse, midwife (born 1867)
 14 February – Sir Thomas Mackenzie, politician, Prime Minister of New Zealand (1912) (born 1853)
 21 February – Charles Garrard, cricketer, school inspector (born 1868)

March–April
 4 March – Henry Michel, politician (born 1855)
 11 March – George Edgecumbe, newspaper proprietor, businessman (born 1845)
 5 April – Wereta Tainui Pitama, Ngāi Tahu leader, politician (born 1881)
 10 April – John McCaw, farmer (born 1849)
 16 April – Makereti Papakura, tour guide, entertainer, ethnographer (born 1873)

May–June
 20 May – Adelaide Hicks, midwife (born 1845)
 29 May – William Charles Nation, spiritualist, Arbor Day advocate (born 1840)
 30 May – William Chatfield, architect (born 1851)
 26 June – Frederick Cooke, trade unionist, politician (born 1867)
 27 June –  Sir Māui Pōmare, doctor, politician (born 1875)

July–August
 3 July – Tom Cross, rugby union and rugby league player (born 1876)
 8 July – Sir Joseph Ward, politician, Prime Minister of New Zealand (1906–12, 1928–30) (born 1856)
 19 July – Sir Robert Stout, politician, Premier of New Zealand (1884, 1884–87) (born 1844)
 24 July – Alfred Philpott, museum curator, entomologist (born 1870)
 30 July – George Hutchison, politician (born 1846)
 10 August – Bill Hawkins, cricketer, politician (born 1861)
 15 August – Wesley Spragg, butter manufacturer, temperance campaigner, benefactor (born 1848)
 18 August – James Flesher, politician, mayor of Christchurch (1923–25) (born 1865)
 20 August – George Hunter, politician, racehorse breeder (born 1859)
 27 August
 Emily Hill, schoolteacher, suffragist, temperance worker (born 1847)
 Robert Neill, cricketer (born 1864)

September–October
 4 September
 George Duncan, mining and tramway engineer (born 1852)
 Thomas Hickman, police officer (born 1848)
 9 September – Alexander Bathgate, lawyer, businessman, writer, conservationist (born 1845)
 11 September – William Parker, cricketer (born 1862)
 24 September – Harry McNish, carpenter, Antarctic explorer (born 1874)
 1 October
 Marjory Nicholls, poet, drama producer (born 1890)
 Hoeroa Tiopira, rugby union player (born 1871)
 5 October – Frederick Fitchett, politician (born 1851)
 13 October – Alfred George, newspaper proprietor (born 1854)
 14 October – Thomas Fleming, miller (born 1848)
 17 October – Amelia Randall, community leader, businesswoman, benefactor (born 1844)
 21 October – Frank McNeill, cricketer (born 1877)
 27 October – Francis Watson, cricketer (born 1860)
 29 October – George Ewing, cricketer (born 1851)

November–December
 1 November – Heni Materoa Carroll, Te Aitanga-a-Māhaki leader (born 1854)
 3 November – Nellie Ferner, artist photographer, community leader (born 1869)
 8 November – Robert Scott, railway engineer, academic (born 1861)
 12 November – Crawford Anderson, politician (born 1848)
 7 December – John Barr, politician (born 1867)
 15 December – Cecil de Lautour, politician (born 1845)
 17 December – Arthur O'Callaghan, politician (born 1837)
 29 December – Otene Paora, Ngāti Whātua leader, Anglican lay reader, land negotiator (born 1870)

See also
List of years in New Zealand
Timeline of New Zealand history
History of New Zealand
Military history of New Zealand
Timeline of the New Zealand environment
Timeline of New Zealand's links with Antarctica

References

External links

 
Years of the 20th century in New Zealand